Stenothecoida is a taxon of bivalved fossils from the Early to middle Cambrian period.  They look a bit like brachiopods or bivalve molluscs.

Affinity
Their affinity is uncertain. They were considered by E. L. Yochelson 1968 to belong to Mollusca, whereas Runnegar and Pojeta (1974) suggested that they might be 'bivalved monoplacophorans'.  This said, the morphology of the shell does not resemble the shell of any other class of molluscs; they also look a little like brachiopods It's not clear whether their two valves are each other's mirror images, as in bivalve molluscs, though they aren't identical to one another [?]. It's more likely that the valves each have a single plane of symmetry (as in brachiopods), suggesting a brachiopod affiliation.

As with many other Cambrian taxa, it has been suggested that they arise through reduction of a Halkieria-like ancestor.

Mineralogy
Thought to be low-Mg calcite.

Occurrence
The earliest occurrence dates to 525 Ma.

These fossil shells have been found in Canada, China, Greenland, Kazakhstan, Kyrgyzstan, and the USA.

References

 Start of article at Springer Reference
 Paleobiology Database info on this class
 Abstract of a Yochelson 2007 article on the proposed class

Prehistoric mollusc taxonomy
Mollusc classes
Prehistoric protostome classes